Bekal is both a given name and a surname. Notable people with the name include:

Bekal Utsahi (1928–2016), Indian poet, writer, and politician
Nalini Bekal (born 1954), Malayalam novelist and short story writer

See also 

 Bekal (disambiguation)